The Sekmenevsk Formation (Russian: Sekmenevska Svita) is a Cretaceous (Albian to Cenomanian) geologic formation in the Kursk Oblast of European Russia. Pterosaur fossils have been recovered from the formation.

Fossil content 
The following fossils have been reported from the formation:
 Poekilopleuron schmidti
 Reptilia indet.

See also 
 List of pterosaur-bearing stratigraphic units
 List of fossiliferous stratigraphic units in Russia
 Melovatka Formation

References

Bibliography 
 

Geologic formations of Russia
Cretaceous System of Europe
Cretaceous Russia
Albian Stage
Cenomanian Stage
Sandstone formations
Paleontology in Russia
Geology of European Russia
Formations